Scott is a masculine given name of Scottish origin. Notable people and fictional characters with the name include:

 Scott Adams, American cartoonist
 Scott Adkins, English actor
 Scott Aldred, former American baseball player
 Scott Alexander, American baseball player
 Scott Ambush, American musician
 Scott Angelle, interim lieutenant governor of Louisiana
 Scott Antol (born 1971), American professional wrestler
 Scott Armstrong (wrestler) (born 1959), American wrestler and referee
 Scott Atkinson (1966–2021), American actor and screenwriter
 Scott Baio, American actor and television director
 Scott Bakula, American television actor
 Scott Barlow, Australian businessman
 Scott Barlow (baseball), American baseball player
 Scott Bennett, several people
 Scott Braddock, American retired professional wrestler
 Scott Brison, Canadian politician
 Scott Brown (disambiguation), multiple people
 Scott Brownlee (born 1969), New Zealand rower
 Scott Budnick (film producer), American film producer 
 Scott Burcham (born 1993), American-Israeli baseball player
 Scott Burns (disambiguation), multiple people
 Scott Caan, American actor
 Scott Casey (born 1947), American retired professional wrestler
 Scott Cassell, American explorer and underwater filmmaker
 Scott Cassidy, American baseball player
 Scott Cawthon, American video game designer and animator
 Scott Coffey (born 1964), American actor, director, producer and screenwriter
 Scott Colton (born 1980), American wrestler
 Scott Coker (born 1962), American mixed martial artist
 Scott Colomby (born 1952), American film, television, and stage actor
 Scott Cormode, American theologian
 Scott William Cox (born 1963), American suspected serial killer
 Scott Curtis (American football) (born 1964), American football player
 Scott Daly (born 1994), American football player
 Scott Deibert (born 1970), Canadian football player
 Scott Disick (born 1983), American media personality and socialite
 Scott Dixon, Indycar driver
 Scott Dyleski, American murderer
 Scott Eastwood (born 1986), American actor
 Scott Effross (born 1993), American baseball pitcher
 Scott Elarton, retired American baseball player
 Scott Ellsworth (born 1927), American radio personality, news presenter, and actor
 Scott Emerson (baseball), American baseball coach
 Scott Erskine (1962–2020), American serial killer 
 Scott Fellows (born 1965), American television writer and producer
 Scott Fitterer (born 1973), American football executive
 Scott Flemming (born 1958), American basketball coach
 Scott Flinders (born 1986), English professional footballer
 Scott Forstall, American software engineer
 Scott Frankel, American composer
 Scott Galloway (born 1995), Australian soccer player
 Scott Garson (born 1976), American college basketball coach 
 Scott Glasgow, Hollywood-based musical composer
 Scott Glenn, American actor
 Scott Goldblatt, American swimmer
 Scott Griekspoor, Dutch tennis player
 Scott Grimes (born 1971), American actor
 Scott Halberstadt (born 1976), American actor
 Scott Hall (1958–2022), American professional wrestler
 Scott Hanson (born 1971), host of NFL RedZone
 Scott Harding, Australian football player
 Scott Hartnell (born 1982), Canadian hockey player
 Scott Hastings (disambiguation), multiple people
 Scott B. Hayashi (born 1953), American eleventh and current bishop of the Episcopal Diocese of Utah
 Scott Helman, Canadian singer-songwriter
 Scott Hileman, retired American soccer player
 Scott Hilton (American football) (born 1954), American football player
 Scott Hilton (politician), member of the Georgia House of Representatives 
 Scott Hoying, American singer-songwriter and actor
 Scott Huckabay, American musician
 Scott Hylands (born 1943), Canadian actor 
 Scott Innes, American voice actor, country music singer
 Scott Israel (born 1956/57), American Police Chief of Opa-locka, former Sheriff of Broward County
 Scott Jaffe, American freestyle swimmer
 Scott James (disambiguation)
 Scott Johnson (cartoonist), American cartoonist and podcaster
 Scott Joplin, American ragtime composer
 Scott Kashket (born 1996), English striker for Wycombe Wanderers
 Scott Kazmir, American baseball player
 Scott Kay, English footballer
 Scott Kellar, American football player
 Scott Kelly (disambiguation)
 Scott Kingery (born 1994), American baseball player
 Scott Koskie, Canadian volleyball player
 Scott Kriens, American chairman and former CEO of Juniper Networks
 Scott Kurtz, American cartoonist
 Scott Kyle, Scottish actor
 Scott LaFaro (1936–1961), American jazz double bassist 
 Scott Laird (born 1988), English professional footballer
 Scott Levy (born 1964), American wrestler better known as Raven
 Scott Laughton, Canadian ice hockey player
 Scott Leitch, Scottish football player
 Scott Lipsky (born 1981), American tennis player
 Scott Lockwood, American football player
 Scott Lost, (born 1980), American retired professional wrestler
 Scott Machado (born 1990), basketball player in the Israeli Basketball Premier League
 Scott MacIntyre, American singer
 Scott Manley, Scottish astrophysicist
 Scott Martin (disambiguation), multiple people
 Scott Maslen, British actor
 Scott Matthews, English singer-songwriter
 Scott McClanahan, American writer
 Scott McGregor (disambiguation), multiple people
 Scott McKenzie, American singer
 Scott McLaughlin (born 1993), New Zealanders racing drivers
 Scott McNeil, Canadian voice actor
 Scott Meenagh (born 1989), British nordic skier
 Scott Menville, American voice actor
 Scott Mersereau (born 1965), American former defensive lineman
 Scott Mescudi, American rapper
 Scott Andrew Mink (1963–2004), American murderer
 Scott Moir, Canadian figure skater
 Scott Morrison (born 1968), Australian politician, 30th prime minister of Australia
 Scott Morrison (disambiguation), multiple people
 Scott Mosher, Canadian field hockey player
 Scott Mosier, American film producer, editor and actor
 Scott Muirhead, Scottish football player
 Scott Miller (disambiguation), multiple people
 Scott Mills, British DJ, TV presenter and actor
 Scott Nelson, New Zealand race walker
 Scott Neri, Mexican painter and poet
 Scott Neville, Australian soccer player
 Scott Niedermayer, American ice hockey player
 Scott Norton (born 1961), American semi-retired professional wrestler
 Scott Norton (bowler) (born 1982), American professional bowler and attorney
 Scott Oberg, American baseball player
 Scott Orndoff, American football player
 Scott Owen, Australian musician, The Living End
 Scott Page, American musician
 Scott Palmer (American football), American football player
 Scott Patterson (disambiguation), multiple people
 Scott Paulin (born 1950), American actor and director
 Scott Pendlebury, Australian football player
 Scott Perry (disambiguation), multiple people
 Scott Peterson, American convicted murderer
 Scottie Pippen, basketball player
 Scott Podsednik, American baseball player
 Scott Porter  (born 1979), American actor and occasional singer
 Scott Porter (rugby league) (born 1985), Australian former professional rugby league footballer
 Scott Powell (born 1948), American musician
 Scott Putski (born 1966), American professional wrestler
 Scott Quessenberry, American football player
 Scott Quigley (born 1992), English professional footballer 
 Scott Rains (1956–2016), American travel writer, consultant, and advocate for disabled people
 Scott Ramsoomair, creator of VG Cats
 Scott Radinsky (born 1968), American MLB player
 Scott Raynor, drummer for the band Blink-182
 Scott Redl, Canadian football player
 Scott Rolen, American baseball player
 Scott Schenkel, American business executive, CEO of eBay
 Scott Schoeneweis, American baseball player
 Scott Schwedes, American football player
 Scott Semptimphelter, American football player
 Scott Servais, American baseball manager and former player
 Scott Shleifer (born 1977), American billionaire hedge fund manager
 Scott Simon (born 1961), American Republican member 
 Scott Slutzker, American football player
 Scott Spann (swimmer), American swimmer
 Scott Speed, American NASCAR driver
 Scott Speedman (born 1975), British-Canadian actor
 Scott Speicher (1957–1991), American naval aviator
 Scott Stapp, American singer, songwriter, and founding member of the band Creed
 Scott Steiner, American professional wrestler
 Scott Stevens, American ice hockey player
 Scott Stringer (born 1960), American New York City Comptroller and Borough President of Manhattan, 2021 mayoral candidate for New York City 
 Scott Symons, Canadian writer
 Scott Teems, American film director, screenwriter, and producer
 Scott Terry, American baseball player
 Scott Thompson (disambiguation), multiple people
 Scott Tolzien, American football player
 Scott Touzinsky (born 1982), American volleyball player and coach
 Scott Travis, American drummer for the band Judas Priest
 Scott Tucker (disambiguation), multiple people
 Scott Tuma, American musician from Chicago
 Scott Tupper, Canadian field hockey player
 Scott Unrein, American composer
 Scott Vallow, retired American soccer player
 Scott Van Pelt, American sportscaster
 Scott Walker, multiple people
 Scott L. Waugh, American historian and academic administrator 
 Scott Weiland, American lead singer of Stone Temple Pilots and Velvet Revolver
 Scott Weinger, American actor
 Scott James Wells (1961–2015), American actor and model
 Scott White (disambiguation), several people
 Scott Williams (field hockey player), American field hockey player
 Scott Wimmer, American former NASCAR driver
 Scott Wolf, American actor
 Scott Wood, American basketball player
 Scott Wood (American football), American football player
 Scott Woods, American poet
 Scott Wozniak, American creator of Scott the Woz
 Scott Zahra, former Australian rugby league footballer
 Scott Zakarin, American film producer
 Scott Zolak, American football broadcaster
 Scott Zwizanski, American cyclist

Fictional characters
 Scott, a character from Total Drama: Revenge of the Island
 Scott Bardo, a character in the American web series Zombie College
 Scott Bernard in Robotech (TV series)
 Scott "Tracker" Cameron, in Degrassi: The Next Generation
 Scott Calvin, protagonist of The Santa Clause
 Scott Drinkwell, character from the British soap opera Hollyoaks
 Scott (Heroes), marine recruited by the Pinehearst Company
 Scott Howard, the main character played by Michael J. Fox in 1985 American coming-of-age romantic fantasy comedy movie Teen Wolf
 Scott Landon, a character in Lisey's Story
 Scott Lang, Marvel superhero who uses Pym Particles to become the Ant-Man
 Scott Pilgrim, protagonist of an eponymous graphic novel series
 Scott Reed, a character in the Netflix series 13 Reasons Why
 Scott Robinson, a character in the Australian soap opera Neighbours
 Scott Scanlon, a character in the American teen drama television series Beverly Hills 90210
 Scott Sterling (fictional), a football goalie appearing in sketch comedy
 Scott Summers, also known as Cyclops, member and leader of the Marvel Comics team, the X-Men
 Scott Tenorman, a character in the animated TV comedy South Park
 Scott Tracy in the British TV series Thunderbirds
 Scott Tyler, an American boy with mind control powers from Anthony Horowitz' The Power of Five series
 Scott Trakker from M.A.S.K. (TV series)

See also

English-language masculine given names
English masculine given names
Scottish masculine given names